The Bezirk Hermagor is an administrative district (Bezirk) in Carinthia, Austria.

The administrative center of the district is Hermagor-Pressegger See.

History
Its name refers to Saint Hermagoras, whose cult was centered at Aquileia.

Municipalities 

Towns (Städte) are indicated in boldface; market towns (Marktgemeinden) in italics; suburbs, hamlets and other subdivisions of a municipality are indicated in small characters.
Dellach (Slov.: Dole) (4)
Dellach, Goldberg, Gurina, Höfling, Leifling, Monsell, Nölbling, Rüben, Siegelberg, St. Daniel, Stollwitz, Wieserberg
Gitschtal (Slov.: Višprijska Dolina) (5)
Brunn, Golz, Jadersdorf, Langwiesen, Lassendorf, Leditz, Regitt, St. Lorenzen im Gitschtal, Weißbriach, Wulzentratten
Hermagor-Pressegger See (Slov.: Šmohor - Preseško jezero) (1)
Achleiten, Aigen, Bergl, Braunitzen, Brugg, Burgstall, Danz, Dellach, Egg, Eggforst, Förolach, Fritzendorf, Görtschach, Götzing, Grafenau, Grünburg, Guggenberg, Hermagor, Jenig, Kameritsch, Khünburg, Kleinbergl, Kraschach, Kraß, Kreuth ob Mellweg, Kreuth ob Möschach, Kreuth ob Rattendorf, Kühweg, Kühwegboden, Latschach, Liesch, Mellach, Mellweg, Micheldorf, Mitschig, Möderndorf, Nampolach, Neudorf, Neuprießenegg, Obermöschach, Obervellach, Paßriach, Podlanig, Postran, Potschach, Potschach, Presseggen, Presseggersee, Radnig, Radnigforst, Rattendorf, Schinzengraben, Schlanitzen, Schmidt, Siebenbrünn, Sonnenalpe Naßfeld, Sonnleitn, Süßenberg, Toschehof, Tröpolach, Untermöschach, Untervellach, Watschig, Wittenig, Zuchen
Kirchbach (Slov.: Cirkno) (2)
Anraun, Bodenmühl, Forst, Goderschach, Grafendorf, Griminitzen, Gundersheim, Hochwart, Katlingberg, Kirchbach, Krieben, Lenzhof, Oberbuchach, Oberdöbernitzen, Rauth, Reisach, Reißkofelbad, Rinsenegg, Schimanberg, Schmalzgrube, Schönboden, Staudachberg, Stöfflerberg, Stranig, Tramun, Treßdorf, Unterbuchach, Unterdöbernitzen, Waidegg, Wassertheurerberg, Welzberg 
Kötschach-Mauthen (Slov.: Koče - Muta) (3)
Aigen, Buchach, Dobra, Dolling, Gailberg, Gentschach, Gratzhof, Höfling, Kosta, Kötschach, Kreuth, Kreuzberg, Krieghof, Kronhof, Laas, Lanz, Mahlbach, Mandorf, Mauthen, Nischlwitz, Passau, Plöcken, Plon, Podlanig, Sittmoos, St. Jakob im Lesachtal, Strajach, Weidenburg, Wetzmann, Würda, Würmlach
Lesachtal (Slov.: Lesna dolina) (6)
Assing, Birnbaum, Durnthal, Egg, Frohn, Guggenberg, Klebas, Kornat, Ladstatt, Liesing, Maria Luggau, Mattling, Moos, Niedergail, Nostra, Obergail, Oberring, Pallas, Promeggen, Raut, Rüben, Salach, St. Lorenzen im Lesachtal, Stabenthein, Sterzen, Tiefenbach, Tscheltsch, Tuffbad, Wiesen, Wodmaier, Xaveriberg
Sankt Stefan im Gailtal (Slov.: Štefan na Zilji) (7)
Bach, Bichlhof, Bodenhof, Dragantschach, Edling, Hadersdorf, Karnitzen, Köstendorf, Latschach, Matschiedl, Nieselach, Pölland, Pörtschach, Schinzengraben, Schmölzing, St. Paul an der Gail, St. Stefan an der Gail, Sussawitsch, Tratten, Vorderberg

References

External links 

 
Districts of Carinthia (state)